Nunatak Gongamur is the first studio album by the electronic artist Thomas Köner. It was released in 1990 on the Barooni record company. The album contains only one electronically controlled timbre, the gong. Roland Speckle helped with the production of the album. A nunatak is a mountainous rock summit not covered with ice or snow within an ice field or glacier, and is found mostly on the North Pole.

Track listing
"Untitled" – 3:23
"Untitled" – 6:03
"Untitled" – 4:28
"Untitled" – 5:22
"Untitled" – 6:24
"Untitled" – 3:28
"Untitled" – 5:06
"Untitled" – 3:25
"Untitled" – 3:28
"Untitled" – 3:12
"Untitled" – 4:04

References

External links
 Discogs entry
 Type Records reissue

1990 albums
Thomas Köner albums
Albums produced by Thomas Köner